Danil Sergeyevich Savinykh (born 16 January 2001) is a Russian football player. He plays for FC Zenit-2 Saint Petersburg.

Club career
He made his debut in the Russian Football National League for FC Tom Tomsk on 29 August 2021 in a game against FC Rotor Volgograd.

References

External links
 
 Profile by Russian Football National League

2001 births
Sportspeople from Tomsk
Living people
Russian footballers
Association football defenders
PFC CSKA Moscow players
FC Tom Tomsk players
FC Zenit-2 Saint Petersburg players
Russian First League players